Wahiduddin Mahmud is an economist from Bangladesh. He is a member of the United Nations Committee for Development Policy. He was in charge of the Ministry of Finance and Planning in the Caretaker Government of Bangladesh in 1996.

Early life
Mahmud completed his matriculation from Annada Government High School, Brahmanbaria. Then he moved to Dhaka to study economics in Dhaka University. He obtained his PhD in economics from Cambridge University. He joined University of Dhaka as a professor of economics.

Career
Mahmud is a member of International Growth Centre based at London School of Economics. He has held positions at Cambridge University,  Oxford University, IDS at Sussex, IFPRI, and the World Bank. He was part of many government committees and commissions in Bangladesh relating to micro-finance, national income, agricultural reforms, PRSP and MDG monitoring. He has also participated in Five Year Plans for Government of Bangladesh. He has co-founding chairman for PKSF, the apex organization for funding the micro-credit programs of NGOs in Bangladesh.

Books

References

Living people
Bangladeshi economists
Year of birth missing (living people)
People from Comilla District
University of Dhaka alumni
Alumni of the University of Cambridge
Alumni of the London School of Economics